Amal Anbari (born on April 16, 1987), is a Bahraini-Moroccan actress and singer.

Biography
Born in Morocco, Anbari holds Bahraini citizenship, and her debut was on the fourth season of Star Academy, broadcast in 2006 on LBC out of Lebanon. After her elimination from the show, she moved to Beirut, from whence she moved again to live with her aunt in Kuwait. In 2010, she enrolled at the Higher Institute of Dramatic Arts there, but she left for a casting call in Bahrain with Kuwaiti director Mohammed Daham Al-Shammari.

Personal life
Anbari married Kuwaiti-Lebanese fashion designer Usama Faham, brother of her manager Zakaria Faham, in 2008, and left the entertainment business for some time. She separated in mid-2009, resuming her career and marrying a Bahraini businessman, whereby she acquired Bahraini citizenship.

Music
Anbari released several singles, starting with her own composition, “روح إبعد بعيد” (“So Far Away”). Two more singles were released in Bahrain. “رضيت بالمر” was accompanied by a video filmed in Kuwait and featured lyrics by Meshal Al-Zayer, music by Nasser Naif, and arranged by Bader Karam. “كثير كثير” (“Very Much”), recorded in Lebanon, featured music by Tareq Abu Judeh, lyrics by Elias Nasser, arranged by Michel Fadel.

Acting breakthrough
Anbari's breakthrough into acting came when Al-Shammari cast her in بعدك طيب (“Beyond Taib”), after which she mastered Kuwaiti Arabic, which she would use in later television and theater roles.

Career

Scripted television

Theatre

Film

Variety television

External links
 El Cinema filmography

References

1987 births
Bahraini television actresses
Bahraini stage actresses
Bahraini film actresses
Moroccan expatriates in Bahrain
Living people